Lipwoni  Atwoli (born 36 June 1949) is a Kenyan trade unionist who is currently serving as the Secretary General of the Central Organization of Trade Unions (Kenya), COTU (K). He has served in that capacity since he was first elected in 2001. He has equally been serving as the General Secretary of the Kenya Plantation and Agricultural Workers' Union since 1994.

Career
In his role as a representative of Kenyan workers,Francis Atwoli has continued championing for social justice by advocating for decent work, accountable governments, and better policies for workers. This has seen the membership of COTU (K) grow from 300,000 to now over 4,000,000. One of the major achievements of Atwoli was mainstreaming labor rights in the 2010 constitution.    

Some of the official capacities Atwoli has served in, include : 

 2001 – to-date: Secretary General of the Central Organisation of Trade Unions Kenya.
 1994 – to-date: General Secretary of the Kenya Plantation & Agricultural Workers Union.
 1986 – 1994: Director of the Central Organisation of Trade Unions, Kenya.
 1971 – 1986: Branch Secretary, Union of Posts and Telecommunication Employees.
 1967 – 1986: Senior Technician at Kenya Posts & Telecommunication Corporation.

Elected positions and appointments

Other considerations
In addition to his responsibilities at COTU, Atwoli has the following additional responsibilities:

 Independent Non-Executive Director, National Bank of Kenya
 Chairman, East African Trade Union Confederation
 President, Trade Union Federation of Eastern Africa
 President, Organisation of African Trade Union Unity
 Member, Governing Body, International Labour Organization
 Vice President, International Labour Conference
 Vice President, The International Trade Union Confederation
 Secretary General, Kenya Plantation & Agricultural Workers Union

Awards
He is a recipient of both the Chief of the Burning Spear (CBS),  Elder of the Burning Spear (EBS) and the  Moran of the Burning Spear, (MBS) awards in recognition of his role in Championing for Social Justice.

Masinde Muliro University of Science and Technology conferred Atwoli the degree of Doctor of Humane Letters (Labour Relations) Honoris Causa of Masinde Muliro University of Science and Technology.

Family
Atwoli is married to two women, Jenifer Khainza and Mary Kilobi. Mr. Francis Atwoli has seventeen children.

References

External links
Atwoli: Foul-Mouthed Liability Or A Straight-Shooting Realist? As at 21 April 2019.
You've failed Kenya, Kibaki and Raila told As of 19 February 2009.

1949 births
Living people
Luhya people
Kenyan politicians
Kenyan trade union leaders
People from Bungoma County